Woodland Hall is a historic home located near Kennedyville, Kent County, Maryland.

It was listed on the National Register of Historic Places in 2008.

References

External links
 at Maryland Historical Trust

Houses on the National Register of Historic Places in Maryland
Houses in Kent County, Maryland
National Register of Historic Places in Kent County, Maryland